Republican Platform is a political party in Ukraine. It was the first registered political party in Ukraine, created on November 5, 1990 by the Ministry of Justice of UkrSSR. RP was founded earlier that year in place of the Ukrainian Helsinki Group in April 1990.

Previous names
1990 – 2002: Ukrainian Republican party
2002 – 2011: Ukrainian Republican Party "Sobor"
2011 – 2015: Ukrainian Platform "Sobor"
2015: Republican platform

History
November 1976 – Ukrainian community groups was established to promote the implementation of the Helsinki agreements. Almost all members of this Ukrainian Helsinki Group were subsequently repressed; four of them (V. Stus, Yu. Lytvyn, O. Tykhyi, V. Marchenko) died in Soviet camps.

March 1988 – Ukrainian Helsinki Union (UKhS) was formed. Since 1989, UKhS has moved to open propaganda activity, promoting the independence of Ukraine.

April 29–30, 1990 – Ukrainian Republican Party (URP) was established in the place of the UKhS. The party was registered on November 5, 1990 by the Ministry of Justice of the Ukrainian SSR as the first political party in Ukraine.

A 1992 split in the party resulted in the creation of the rival Ukrainian Conservative Republican Party (UKRP) led by Stepan Khmara.

In the 1994 parliamentary elections the URP core party obtained nine seats initially, adding three more by the end of the year.

During the 1998 Ukrainian parliamentary election the party was part (together with Congress of Ukrainian Nationalists & Ukrainian Conservative Republican Party) of the Election Bloc "National Front" which won 2,71% of the national votes and 6 (single-mandate constituency) seats. In January 2001 the "National Front" parliamentary faction had grown to 17 deputies.

After being part of the National Salvation Committee the party became part of the Yulia Tymoshenko Electoral Bloc alliance during the Ukrainian 2002 parliamentary elections. On April 21, 2002 the party merged with the Ukrainian People's Party "Sobor" as the Ukrainian Republican Party "Sobor".

On 15 October 2012 the party withdrew itself from the national list of the 2012 Ukrainian parliamentary election. In the election it did not win any constituencies (it had competed in 12 constituencies) and thus failed to win parliamentary representation.

In the 2014 Ukrainian parliamentary election the participated in 6 constituencies; but its candidates lost in all of them and thus the party won no parliamentary seats.

Local elections

2010
In the 2010 local elections the party won a few representatives in 3 regional parliaments, all in Western Ukraine.

Elections

References

External links
 Official site

1990 establishments in Ukraine
Conservative parties in Ukraine
Political parties established in 1990
Political parties in Ukraine
Pro-independence parties in the Soviet Union